Hamada Tolba (born 17 June 1981) is an Egyptian footballer who currently plays for Petrojet SC and the Egyptian National Team as a defender.

Career

El Merreikh
Tolba started playing football at youth level in Merreikh FC in Port Said. Mimi Abdelrazek, the manager of Merreikh then, made Tolba play his first game with the first team in 1999-2000 season in Egyptian League B. He started his career as a right back with Merreikh. Then he played as a winger then as a defensive midfielder.

Suez Cement FC
In 2006, Tarek Yehia, the manager of Suez Cement, requested Hamada Tolba to join his team. Yehia said: "Tolba was very fast and a very good dribbler, I made use of his strength and speed as a striker and as a winger and he scored many goals".

Smouha SC
Tolba's former manager Mimi Abdelrazek asked Tolba to join Smouha SC in season 2009-2010. He played an extraordinary season helping his team to solidify its position on their first season in the Egyptian premier league. He played as a defensive midfielder.

Misr El-Makasa
Tarek Yehia, Tolba's former Manager, asked Tolba to join Misr El-Makasa in 2011. Tolba joined El-Makasa for a transfer fee of L.E. 1,300,000.

Zamalek
Tolba joined Zamalek in 2013 for a transfer fee of L.E.3,000,000. He played as a centre back until Mohamed Abdel-Shafy the main left back left the club. Tolba started playing as a left back.

International career
Tolba was called to join Egyptian national team for the first time in 2015 by manager Héctor Cúper in a match against chad. He was benched the entire match. On February 27, 2016, he was subbed on against Burkina Faso, marking his Egyptian National Team debut at the age of 34. He played his first official international match against Nigeria at the age of 34 years and 7 months. He made an extraordinary save, where he got Victor Moses ball from the goal line.

Style of Play
Tolba did not stick to any position his entire career. He played as a striker, winger, defensive midfielder, centre back, right back, and left back. He is called The Joker by Zamalek fans because he can do any role in the field except goalkeeping. He is always praised for his effort and fighting over every ball.

Honors
Zamalek SC
Egyptian Premier League (1): 2014-15
Egypt Cup (3): 2012-13, 2013-14, 2014-15

External links
 
 

1981 births
Living people
Sportspeople from Port Said
Egyptian footballers
Egyptian Premier League players
Association football midfielders
Smouha SC players
Misr Lel Makkasa SC players
Zamalek SC players
Al Masry SC players
ENPPI SC players
Pyramids FC players
Petrojet SC players